Michael Timm (born 13 November 1962 in Hagenow, Bezirk Schwerin) is a retired East German amateur boxer. He is best known for winning the gold medal at the 1985 European Championships in Budapest, Hungary in the Men's Light Middleweight division.

External links
 Profile

1962 births
Living people
People from Hagenow
People from Bezirk Schwerin
German male boxers
Sportspeople from Mecklenburg-Western Pomerania
Recipients of the Patriotic Order of Merit in silver
Light-middleweight boxers